Rock in the Red Zone is a documentary film about the many rock and roll bands that have come out of Sderot, a town in southern Israel that has been under almost daily attack for many years by Qassam rockets fired from Gaza by Hamas and Islamic Jihad. Young musicians use one of the town's bomb shelters as a rock and roll club.

The director/producer is Laura Bialis.

The film has screened at multiple film festivals internationally and around the United States: AICE Israeli Film Festival (Australia), San Francisco Jewish Film Festival, Sonoma Jewish Film Festival, Washington Jewish Film Festival, Boston Jewish Film Festival, Atlanta Jewish Film Festival 2016, Rutgers Jewish Film Festival.

References

External links

2014 films
Documentary films about the Israeli–Palestinian conflict
Documentary films about Jews and Judaism
Israeli documentary films
Israeli music
Rockumentaries
Sderot
2010s English-language films